The New Leader (1924–2010) was an American political and cultural magazine.

History
The New Leader began in 1924 under a group of figures associated with the Socialist Party of America, such as Eugene V. Debs and Norman Thomas. It was published in New York City by the American Labor Conference on International Affairs. Its orientation was liberal and anti-communist. The Tamiment Institute was its primary supporter.

Its overall politics shifted in its second decade:  Under Levitas's editorship, during years when the much-higher-circulation Nation and New Republic often ran acrobatic apologies for Stalin, the New Leader became a bi-weekly platform for what was then known as liberal anti-Communism.

Editors

 1924-1940: James Oneal, founding editor
 1936-1960: Sol Levitas, managing editor
 1940-1960:  Sol Levitas, executive editor
 1945-1950: Liston M. Oak, managing editor
 1950-1960: Suzanne La Follette, managing editor
 1960-1961: Myron Kolatch, managing editor
 1960-2006:  Myron Kolatch, executive editor

Contributors
Its contributors were prominent liberal thinkers and artists. The New Leader was the first to publish Joseph Brodsky and Aleksandr Solzhenitsyn in the United States. It was the first to publish Martin Luther King Jr.'s 1963 "Letter from Birmingham Jail". Other contributors, who were generally paid nothing or only a modest fee, included James Baldwin, Daniel Bell, Willy Brandt, David Dallin, Milovan Djilas, Theodore Draper, Max Eastman, Ralph Ellison, Sidney Hook, Hubert Humphrey, George F. Kennan, Murray Kempton, Irving Kristol, Melvin Lasky, Richard J. Margolis, Reuben Markham, Claude McKay, C. Wright Mills, Hans Morgenthau, Daniel Patrick Moynihan, Albert Murray, Ralph de Toledano, Reinhold Niebuhr, George Orwell, Bertrand Russell, Cyril Joad, Bayard Rustin, Arthur M. Schlesinger Jr. and Tony Sender.

Closure
The New Leader ceased print publication after the January/April 2006 double issue. A bimonthly online version was published from January/February 2007 to May/June/July/August 2010.

Longtime Editor Myron Kolatch conducted an interview with Columbia University's The Current in 2007. He mainly discussed the history of journals of ideas (The New Leader, Partisan Review, The New Republic, National Review) and their role in politics and intellectual discourse. Kolatch's "Who We Are and Where We Came From", adapted from the last print issue, covers some of the same topics.

See also
 James Oneal
 Sol Levitas
 Suzanne La Follette
 Myron Kolatch
 Anti-Stalinist left
 New York intellectuals

Notes

External links
 Official website
 Columbia University New Leader archive
 Columbia University New Leader archive "Biographical Note"

Further reading
 Epstein, Joseph "New Leader Days: Can you have a political magazine without politics?" The Weekly Standard  September 18, 2006.
 Richard Bernstein "65th Birthday Party for a Voice of Liberal Opinion" New York Times.

Biweekly magazines published in the United States
Defunct political magazines published in the United States
New Leader
Magazines established in 1924
Magazines disestablished in 2006
Magazines published in New York City
Online magazines with defunct print editions
Socialist Party of America publications
Socialist magazines
1924 establishments in New York City
2006 disestablishments in New York (state)